HDP may refer to:

Political parties 
 Free Democratic Party (Turkey), in Turkey; defunct
 Hazara Democratic Party, in Pakistan
 Peoples' Democratic Party (Turkey), in Turkey

Science and technology
 Hemodialysis product
 HD Photo, a graphics file format
 Health Device Profile, a Bluetooth profile
 Heme ligase, an enzyme
 Hierarchical decision process
 Hierarchical Dirichlet process, a stochastic process 
 High-density plasma, a type of plasma (physics)
 Hurricane Destruction Potential
 Hydrocarbon dew point
 Hydroxypropyl distarch phosphate, a starch

Other uses
 HDP (album), an album of Czech hip-hop group Prago Union
 Hadapsar railway station, in India
 Harness, Dickey & Pierce, an intellectual property law firm
 Heritage Documentation Programs of the United States National Park Service
 Historical Dictionary Project of the Hebrew Language
 Hortonworks, an American software company